The First Conference of the Communist Parties of Latin America was in Buenos Aires, Argentina, June 1–12, 1929. Thirty-eight delegates, representing Argentina, Brazil, Bolivia, El Salvador, Guatemala, Cuba, Colombia, Ecuador, Mexico, Panama, Paraguay, Peru, Uruguay, and Venezuela, took part in the meeting. The only established communist party in the region that did not participate was the Communist Party of Chile, which at time suffered a period of harsh repression under the government of Carlos Ibáñez del Campo.

The conference agreed on an analysis of the Latin American political development, considering that the revolution in Latin America ought to be anti-imperialist, agrarian, and democratic. The conference also committed itself to an accord of solidarity with the Soviet Union.

Ronaldo Munck, Ricardo Falcón, and Bernardo Galitelli wrote that the conference "set the 'Third Period' course for Latin American communism as a whole."

References

Footnotes

Bibliography

 
 
 
 

1929 conferences
1929 in Argentina
1929 in politics
Communism in North America
Communism in South America
International conferences in Argentina
Political conferences